Medlovice may refer to:

 Medlovice (Uherské Hradiště District)
 Medlovice (Vyškov District)